The Ford FE engine is a Ford V8 engine used in vehicles sold in the North American market between 1958 and 1976. The FE was introduced to replace the short-lived (in the USA) Ford Y-block engine, which American cars and trucks were outgrowing.

"FE" derives from 'Ford-Edsel.' Versions of the FE line designed for use in medium and heavy trucks and school buses from 1964 through 1978 were known as "FT," for 'Ford-Truck,' and differed primarily by having steel (instead of nodular iron) crankshafts, larger crank snouts, smaller ports and valves, different distributor shafts, different water pumps and a greater use of iron for its parts.

Use 

The FE series engines were used in cars, trucks, buses, and boats, as well as for industrial pumps and other equipment. Ford produced the engine from 1958 and ceased production in 1976. Aftermarket support has continued, with replacement parts as well as many newly engineered and improved components.

In Ford vehicles, the FE primarily powered full and midsize cars and trucks. Some of the models in which the FE was installed:

Ford Galaxie,
Ford Custom 500,
Ford Mustang,
Ford Thunderbird - 3rd generation,
Ford Thunderbird - 4th generation,
Ford LTD,
Ford Torino,
Ford Ranchero,
Ford Talladega,
Ford Fairlane,
Ford Fairlane Thunderbolt, and F-Series trucks though typically only those 1 ton and lesser in capacity.

In addition to its use in Ford and Mercury branded vehicles, the FE was also sold to third parties for use in their own products such as buses, and boats. Also, the FE was used to power irrigation pumps, generators and other machinery where long-running, low-rpm, reliable service was required.

Ford regularly made updates to the design of the FE which appear as engineering codes or variations in casting numbers of parts. In addition to production casting codes, Ford also made use of "SK" and "XE" numbers if the parts were one-offs or developmental designs not approved for production. Many parts attached to Ford's racing engines carried SK and XE numbers.

Marine

The FE block was manufactured using a thinwall casting technique, where Ford engineers determined the required amount of metal and re-engineered the casting process to allow for consistent dimensional results. With an aluminum intake and aluminum water pump the FE could be reduced to under . This weight saving was significant to boaters and racers. The FE was popular in V-drive marine applications, available as a factory option in Century boats.

Beginning in 1968, the U.S. Navy SEALS used twin 427 FEs to power their Light SEAL Support Craft (LSSC).

Racing

 

Specific models that used FE engines include the AC Cobra MKIII, GT40s, the AC Frua, as well as various factory racing versions of Ford Mustangs, Ford Galaxies, Ford Fairlanes, and Ford Thunderbirds.

In the 1960s, most organized racing events required either stock components or components that were readily available to the general public. For NASCAR racing, rules required that at least 500 vehicles be sold to the general public equipped as raced. Many drag racing and road racing organizations had similar rules, which contributed to a wide range of performance parts being made available through Ford dealership parts counters. In addition, aftermarket suppliers produced performance parts and accessories.

The use of the FE by Ford itself as the powerplant in many of its racing programs and performance vehicles resulted in constant improvements and engineering changes over the course of its life. Racing-inspired changes to the FE which later made it to production engines included the side-oiler block, which directed oil first to the lower portions of the block.

Road and track racing 
In 1963, the 427 Galaxies dominated NASCAR primarily because in January 1963 G.M. told its divisions to get out of racing. Tiny Lund won the biggest race of the year, the Daytona 500, with 427s finishing first through fifth. Ford won 23 races to Plymouth's 19. The Plymouths earned all their victories on the short tracks while Ford dominated the super speedways, Chevrolet finished with eight wins and Pontiac had four.

In 1964, Ford had their best season ever, with 30 wins. Dodge was second with 14, while Plymouth had 12. Adding the five wins that Mercury had, the 427 had a total of 35 NASCAR Grand National wins for the 1964 season. Fred Lorenzen won the Atlanta 500 and proceeded to beat Dodges and Plymouths, which were using 426 Hemi engines, in six of the next seven races. Ford was using the high-riser intake and matching heads, which were allowed by NASCAR for one season (1964).

In 1965, NASCAR banned Ford's high-riser version of the engine, claiming they did not fit under "stock" hoods. Chrysler's 426 Hemi was banned as well, returning in 1966 after a de-tuned version was installed in a production vehicle that year. For the 1965 season, Ford developed its own version of a hemi-chambered engine, the 427 single overhead cam (SOHC)  "Cammer" which used a single chain-driven overhead camshaft per head to operate the valves in its hemi. NASCAR banned the engine. Then Ford developed the medium-riser intake and head, which fit under stock hoods and was accepted by NASCAR. Ned Jarrett, driving for Ford, was the 1965 Grand National champion and Ford won the NASCAR crown.

Also in 1965, Ford and Carroll Shelby began production of a new and improved Cobra using a 427 cubic inch (7.0 L) FE side-oiler in place of the original's 289 cubic inch Windsor small-block. A new chassis was built enlarging 3" main tubing to 4", with coil springs all around. The new car also had wide fenders and a larger radiator opening. Cobra Mark III production began on 1 January 1965, and was used for racing into the 1970s. An original S/C sold in 2011 for US$1.5 million, making it one of the most valuable Cobra variants.

In 1966, the 427 cubic inch Ford GT40 Mk II dominated the 24 Hours of Le Mans race, with a one-two-three result.

In 1967, Parnelli Jones, in a Holman-Moody prepped Fairlane, won the season-opening Riverside 500 road race. Then, Mario Andretti captured the Daytona 500 in a Fairlane, with Fred Lorenzen a close second in his Holman-Moody Ford.  The FE again powered the 24 Hours of Le Mans winner. In 1968, the rules of the race were changed, limiting displacement to 302 cubic inches under certain circumstances. Ford won the following two years using its Ford Windsor smallblock in the GT40.

Ford's racing partner, privately owned Holman-Moody, also developed a version of the FE for the Can-Am racing series. It used factory-supplied tunnel port heads, a mechanical fuel injection system mounted on a crossram intake manifold, and a revised dry sump oiling system, but met with only limited success.

Drag racing 
Organized drag racing (NHRA, AHRA and even NASCAR dabbled in drag racing in the mid-1960s) was a major venue for the FE in its various forms. Many of the most innovative products were developed and used for 1/4 mile drag racing as aftermarket suppliers eagerly supported the engine design with products such as special intakes, camshafts, superchargers, manifolds, cylinder heads, water and fuel pumps, and exhaust headers.  But it was the Ford company itself which developed the most potent products and platforms for the drag-racer.  Beginning in 1962 and continuing through 1964, Ford made lightweight versions of its popular Galaxie model using aluminum, fiberglass and specially chosen components emphasizing light weight over comfort or style.  Many parts were simply not put on the vehicle, such as a passenger side windshield wiper, sound deadening, armrests, heater, and radio.

In late 1964, Ford contracted Holman & Moody to prepare ten 427-powered Mustangs to contest the National Hot Rod Association's (NHRA) A/Factory Experimental Class in the 1965 drag racing season. Five of these special Mustangs made their competition debut at the 1965 NHRA Winternationals, where they qualified in the Factory Stock FX Eliminator Class for (FX cars only). The car driven by Bill Lawton won the class.

For the 1964 model year, Ford introduced the two-door Fairlane 500 sedan-based Thunderbolt.  Modified to accept a 427 high-riser engine, it featured a teardrop-shaped bubble hood to clear the induction system and drivetrain components from the larger Galaxie model. The two inner headlights were eliminated and replaced with air inlets ducted directly to the two four-barrel carbs.  It was an industry first, the only time that a turn key drag car was made available to the general public. However, the extensive modifications to the car did not meet Ford appearance quality standards.

The 1964 NHRA Super Stock meeting was captured with a Thunderbolt.  However, all three NHRA Top Stock Eliminator titles were won by Chrysler's Race Hemi. Nearly half a century later, in 2013, a Thunderbolt set a new SS/A record of 8.55 seconds in the quarter mile, with a closing speed of 154 mph,

In 1963, Dick Brannan set the NHRA Super/Stock National record at 12.42 on a hot July day. In the biggest race of the year, the INDY Nationals, Ed Martin's lightweight Galaxie lost the Super Stock trophy run to John Barker's Dodge but at the teardown, the Dodge was found to have an illegal cam. In drag racing, the 427 Ford Galaxie was a winner in three consecutive National Events: the '64 Indy Nationals, the 1965 WinterNationals and the 1965 Indy Nationals.  It was Mike Schmitt driving the Desert Motors Galaxie to the AA/SA Class win at the 1964 Indy Nationals. At the 1965 Winternationals it was a clean sweep as Doug Butler's four-speed took the win in AA/S with a 12.77 @ 114.21 and Bill Hanyon won on the automatic side with a 12.24 @ 117.95. Additionally, Bud Schellenberger's "Double A Stock" 1964 Galaxie was the 1965 Indy Nationals Top Stock Eliminator with a 12.16 @ 114.21. The Shelby Super Snake top fuel dragster, powered by a 427 supercharged SOHC, became the first car in NHRA competition to break the six-second quarter-mile time barrier.  It was the winner of the 1966 NHRA Spring Nationals. In every decade since, the FE has held drag-racing records. In 2011, the new decade opens with the NHRA SS/F (class rules include stock compression ratio, stock valve sizes, stock carb sizing and other OEM-type equipment limitations) national record:  the quartermile in 9.29 seconds, with a closing speed of 143.63 mph.

Other closed course racing 
The FE-powered vehicle beat the official British wheel-driven record over the flying 500 and kilometer distances, until then held by Sir Malcolm Campbell, of 174.883 mph

Custom automobiles
The FE engine is used extensively in custom installations.  The extensive availability of multi-carburetor and other exotic intakes, as well as many other "dress-up parts", has contributed to its use where the engine would be shown off.  FEs powered the original Batmobiles built by George Barris for the 1966 TV series.  It fit under the hood along with the Bat-ray, Bat-ram, a nose-mounted aluminum chain slicer and all the associated support hardware of the 5,500-pound vehicle.  One dragstrip version was equipped with a Holman-Moody prepped 427 FE with dual quads, which would be launched in second gear and spin its tires the entire quarter-mile length of the track. In 1968 Carroll Shelby created a custom Mustang using a California Special model and an experimental Ford 428 FE (known as a CJX, precursor to the 428 Cobra Jet). This "Green Hornet" had a custom independent rear suspension, four-wheel disc brakes and a Conelec electronically controlled port fuel injection system.  It had a 5.7 sec 0-60 time and 157 mph top speed, versus a factory 428 cu in FE Shelby GT500's 6.5 second 0-60 and 128 mph top speed.

Description 

The FE and FT engines are Y-block designs—so-called because the cylinder block casting extends below the crankshaft centerline, giving great rigidity and support to the crankshaft's bearings.

Blocks were cast in two major groups:  top-oiler and side-oiler. The top-oiler block sent oil to the top center first, the side-oiler block sent oil along a passage located on the lower side of the block first.

Within the family of Ford engines of the time, the FE was neither the largest nor smallest block.

Because the FE was never a completely static design and was constantly being improved by Ford, references to a particular version of the FE can become difficult. Generally though, most FEs can be described using the following descriptors:

1) Carburetor count, i.e. single 2V (two-barrel), single 4V, dual quad (two 4V carburetors), tripower (three 2V carburetors) or Weber (four 2V Weber carburetors).

2) Top-oiler or side-oiler block (though there are known instances of side-oiler blocks drilled at the factory as top-oilers;  perhaps to salvage blocks with quality control issues that prevented them from being completed as side-oilers).

3) Head type:  low-riser, medium-riser, high-riser, tunnelport, or SOHC. These descriptions actually refer to the intakes used with the heads...a low-riser intake, designed to fit under a low hoodline was the earliest design. The high-riser intake required a bubble in the hood of cars it was installed in for clearance. While the low and medium riser heads could be used in combination with either low or medium riser intakes, the high riser head required a high-riser intake due to the increased height of the intake port. The medium riser's intake port is actually shorter in height, though wider, than the low-riser's port. The high-riser's ports are taller than either the low or medium-riser ports. Low-riser intakes have the carburetor placed relatively low so that the air-fuel mix must follow a more convoluted path to the chamber. A high-riser's intake places the carburetor approximately  higher so the air-fuel mixture has a straighter path to the chamber. The tunnelport and SOHC heads both bolted onto FE blocks of either variety but required their own matching intakes.  Within the major head groups, there were also differences in chamber designs, with small chambers, machined chambers and large chambers.  The size and type of chamber affected the compression ratio, as well as the overall performance characteristics of the engine.

Generation 1

332
The smallest displacement FE engine was the   "332", with a  bore and  stroke. It was used in Ford-brand cars in 1958 and 1959, domestically marketed U.S.- and Canadian-built Edsel-brand cars in 1959, and in export-configured 1958 and 1959 Edsels. The two-barrel version produced , a Holley or Autolite four-barrel version .

332 engine configurations and applications
1st generation FE block shouldn't be confused with  383, 410, 430 Mercury MEL blocks, which had a wedge shaped combustion chamber in their blocks, not in the head as in FE blocks.
 1958 Ford
 1958 Edsel Ranger, Pacer, Villager, Roundup and Bermuda overseas export vehicles only
 1959 Ford
 1959 Edsel Corsair and Villager, standard equipment, (called "Express V8")

352

Introduced in 1958 as part of the Interceptor line of Ford V8 engines, the Ford 352 of  actual displacement was the replacement for the Lincoln Y-block. When these engines were introduced, they were called Interceptor V-8 on the base models and Interceptor Special V-8 on the 4-barrel models. The 1958 H vin coded 352 was designated as Interceptor V-8 Thunderbird Special according to the 1958 Ford V8 Cars & Thunderbird Service Manual pg 483. The Interceptor was the base-performance engine in 1958. For the 1959 model year, the FE engine series was renamed the Thunderbird V-8 and the Thunderbird Special V-8. When installed in Mercury vehicles, these engines were named "Marauder". In 1960 Ford created a high-performance version of the 352 rated at  it featured an aluminum intake manifold, Holley 4160 4-barrel (4-choke) carburetor, cast iron header-style exhaust manifolds, 10.5:1 compression ratio, and solid lifters.

352 engine configurations and applications
 2V
 1965–1967 Ford F-Series
 1961–1963 Ford
 1961–1963 Mercury (1961 Meteor and 1961–1963 Monterey, Commuter Wagon, Colony Park)
 4V
 1958 Ford Interceptor
 1958–1959 Ford
 1958–1959 Ford Thunderbird
 1960 Ford
 1960 Edsel
 1960 Ford Thunderbird
 1960 Ford
 1960 Ford
 1964–1966 Ford

361 Edsel

Edsel 361 engines were assembled in Cleveland Ohio, and Dearborn Michigan. They were standard equipment in the 1958 Edsel Ranger, Pacer, Villager, Roundup and Bermuda.
The Edsel 361 was the very first FE block engine to be offered for sale in any market, having been introduced to the public in the U.S. on September 4, 1957, almost two months before any 1958 Fords were sold.
The 361 cid 4V FE engine was also sold on 1959 Edsels in the U.S. and Canada, and 1958 and 1959 Ford and Meteor brand automobiles in Canada in place of the 352 cid, which was not available with any Ford Motor Company of Canada brand until the 1960 model year. Edsel 361 engines were available to U.S. law enforcement agencies and state and municipal emergency services purchasing fleet Fords as the 1958 Ford "Police Power Pack."

361 Edsel engine configurations and applications
 4V
 10.5:1 Compression Ratio
  @4600 rpm
  Torque @2800 rpm
  x  Bore/Stroke
 4-bbl Holley or Ford (Autolite) carburetor
 Pushrod overhead valve
 Angle-wedge machined combustion chamber
 Firing order: 1-5-4-2-6-3-7-8
 Cylinder numbering (front-to-rear): Right 1-2-3-4 Left 5-6-7-8
 18 mm spark plugs, 0.034 in. gap
 Hydraulic lifters
 1958 Edsel Ranger, Pacer, Villager, Roundup and Bermuda, standard equipment (called "E400")
 4V
 9.6:1 or 10.0:1 Compression Ratio depending on source of information.
  @4600 rpm
  Torque @2800 rpm
  x  Bore/Stroke
 4-bbl Ford (Autolite) carburetor
 Pushrod overhead valve
 Angle-wedge cast combustion chamber
 Firing order: 1-5-4-2-6-3-7-8
 Cylinder numbering (front-to-rear): Right 1-2-3-4 Left 5-6-7-8
 18 mm spark plugs, 0.034 in. gap
 Hydraulic lifters
 1959 Edsel Corsair, Villager and Ranger, optional equipment (called "Super Express V8")

360 Truck
The 361/360, of  actual displacement, was introduced in 1968 and phased out at the end of the 1976-year run; it was used in the Ford F Series trucks and pickups. It has a bore of a 390 and used the 352's  rotating assembly. 361s & 360s were also constructed with heavy duty internal components for truck use. Use of a standard 352/390 cam for use in passenger cars along with carburetor and distributor adjustment allowed the 360 to give performance similar to that of the 352 and 390 car engines. The 360 used the same block, heads and other parts as a 390, this makes them indistinguishable from each other unless the stroke is measured.

360 Truck engine configurations and applications
 2V, 8.4:1
 1968–1971 Trucks
 1972–1976 Trucks

390

It was the most common FE engine in later applications; used in many Ford cars as the standard engine, including the Thunderbird, and in many trucks as well. It was a popular high-performance engine; although not as powerful as the 427 and 428 models, it provided good performance, particularly in lighter-weight vehicles. The  2v is rated at  @ 4,100 rpm, while the 4v version was rated at  @ 4,100 rpm in certain applications. When the 390 was first offered for 1961 model there was a  High Performance version that featured an aluminum 4bbl intake manifold, cast iron "header" style exhaust manifolds, 10.5:1 compression ratio and a solid lifter valve train.

390 engine configurations and applications
 2V
 1963–1965 Mercury
 1964–1965 Mercury
 1966 Ford
 1966 Ford Fairlane
 1966 Mercury
 1966 Mercury Comet
 1967 Ford
 1967–1968 Ford Fairlane
 1967 Mercury
 1967 Mercury Comet
 1968 Ford Mustang
 1968 Mercury Cyclone GT
 1968 Mercury Cougar GT
 1968 Ford
 1969 Mercury
 1968 Ford Fairlane
 1968 Ford Torino
 1968–1970 Ford
 1968–1970 Mercury
 1968–1971 Trucks
 1971 Ford, Mercury
 8.2:1 —  net at 4000 rpm and at 2600 rpm
 1972–1975 Trucks
 4V
 1961–1962 Ford
 1961–1963 Ford
 1961–1963 Ford Thunderbird
 1963 Mercury
 1961–1963 Ford Police Interceptor
 1963 Mercury Police Interceptor
 1964 Ford Police Interceptor
 1964 Mercury Police Interceptor
 1964–1965 Ford
 1964–1965 Mercury
 1964–1965 Ford Thunderbird
 1966–1967 Ford
 1966–1968 Ford Thunderbird
 1968 Mercury
 1967, 1969 Ford Mustang
 1967, 1969 Ford Fairlane
 1967, 1969 Mercury Cyclone GT
 1967, 1969 Mercury Cougar GT
 1969 Ford Torino
 1969 Mercury Montego
 3x2V, 10.6:1
 1961–1962 Ford
 1962 Ford
 1962–1963 Ford Thunderbird

Generation 2

406

The larger bore required a new block casting design allowing for thicker walls, but otherwise was very similar to the 390 block.

It was available for less than two years before it was replaced by the 427.

Testing of the 406, with its higher power levels, led to cross-bolted mains – that is, main bearing caps that were secured not only by bolts at each end coming up from beneath, but also by bolts coming in from the sides through the block. A custom fit spacer was used between the cap and the block face. This design prevented the main bearing caps from "walking" under extreme racing conditions, and can be found today in many of the most powerful and modern engines from many manufacturers.

406 engine configurations and applications
 1962–1963 Ford
 1963 Mercury
 1962 Ford
 1963 Ford, Mercury

410
The 410 engine, used in 1966 and 1967 Mercurys (see Ford MEL engine regarding 1958 senior series Edsels), used the same  bore as the 390 engine, but with the 428's  stroke, giving a  real displacement. The standard 428 crankshaft was used, which meant that the 410, like the 428, used external balancing. A compression ratio of 10.5:1 was standard.

410 engine configurations and applications
 1966–1967 Mercury

427

The 427 V8 was produced as both a top-oiler and side-oiler. Introduced in 1963, its true displacement was 425.98 cubic inches, but Ford called it the 427 because  was the maximum displacement allowed by several racing organizations at the time. The block was made of cast iron with an especially thickened deck to withstand higher compression. The cylinders were cast using cloverleaf molds— the corners were thicker all down the wall of each cylinder. Many 427s used a steel crankshaft and all were balanced internally. Most 427s used solid valve lifters with the exception of the 1968 block which was drilled for use with hydraulic lifters. Space-saving tunnel-port heads with matching intakes were available, which routed pushrods through the intake's ports in brass tunnels. As an engine designed for racing, it had many performance parts available both from the factory and the aftermarket. A race-ready NASCAR 13.6-1 high-riser was good for some +550 hp, depending on tune. This engine was also used in the A/FX-cars like the famous Fairlane Thunderbolt.

Two different 427 blocks were produced, the top oiler and side oiler. The top oiler version was the earlier and delivered oil to the cam and valvetrain first and the crank second. The side oiler, introduced in 1965, sent oil to the crank first and the cam and valvetrain second. This was similar to the oiling design from the earlier Y-block. The engine was available with low-rise, medium-rise, or high-rise heads, and either single or double four-barrel carburetors on an aluminum manifold matched to each head design. Ford never released an official power rating.

The side-oiler powered Ford GT40 MkIIs to a 1-2-3 finish in the 1966 24 Hours of Le Mans, and the winner's podium in 1967.

The 427 remains a popular engine among Ford enthusiasts.

427 SOHC "Cammer"

The Ford single overhead cam (SOHC) 427 V8 engine, familiarly known as the "Cammer", was released in 1964 in an effort to maintain NASCAR dominance by seeking to counter the enormously large block Chrysler 426 Hemi "elephant" engine. The Ford 427 block was closer dimensionally to the smaller 392 cu. in. first generation Chrysler FirePower Hemi; the Ford FE's bore spacing was  compared to the Chrysler 392's .

The engine was based on the high performance 427 side-oiler block, providing race-proven durability. The block and associated parts were largely unchanged, but an idler shaft replaced the camshaft in the block, which necessitated plugging the remaining camshaft bearing oiling holes.

The cast-iron heads were designed with hemispherical combustion chambers and a single overhead camshaft over each head, operating shaft-mounted roller rocker arms. The valvetrain consisted of valves larger than those on Ford wedge head engines, made out of stainless steel and with sodium-filled exhaust valves to prevent the valve heads from burning, and dual valve springs. This design allowed for high volumetric efficiency at high engine speed.

The idler shaft in the block in place of the camshaft was driven by the timing chain and drove the distributor and oil pump in conventional fashion. The length of this chain made precision timing of the camshafts an issue at high RPM.

The engine also had a dual-point distributor with a transistorized ignition amplifier system, running 12 amps of current through a high-output ignition coil.

The engines were essentially hand-built for racing, with combustion chambers fully machined to reduce variability. Nevertheless, Ford recommended blueprinting before use in racing applications. Ford sold them via the parts counter, the single four-barrel model as part C6AE-6007-363S, the dual carburetor model as part C6AE-6007-359J for $2350.00 (as of October, 1968).

Ford's hopes to counter Chrysler were, however, cut short. Although enough 427 SOHCs were sold to have the design homologated, Chrysler protests succeeded in getting NASCAR to effectively legislate the engine out of competition. This was due to the motor not being available in a factory production motor vehicle. It was not the only engine ever banned from NASCAR; the 1963 Chevrolet 427 ‘mystery motor’, the 1965 426 ‘Race Hemi’ and the Chrysler A-925 DOHC Hemi were also banned during the 1960s for the same reason. This scuttled the awaited 1965 SOHC versus Hemi competition at the Daytona 500 season opener.

Nevertheless, the SOHC 427 found its niche in non-stock drag racing, powering many altered-wheelbase A/FX Mustangs, and becoming the basis for a handful of supercharged Top Fuel dragsters, including those of Connie Kalitta, Pete Robinson, and Lou Baney (driven by Don "the Snake" Prudhomme). In 1967 Connie Kalitta's SOHC-powered "Bounty Hunter" slingshot dragster won Top Fuel honors at AHRA, NHRA and NASCAR winter meets, becoming the only "triple crown" winner in drag racing history.  It was also used in numerous nitro funny cars including those of Jack Chrisman, "Dyno" Don Nicholson, Eddie Schartman, Kenz & Leslie, and in numerous injected gasoline drag racing vehicles.

427 engine configurations and applications
 Low-riser intake, 4V
 1968 Mercury Cougar GT-E only (it was to be offered in the Ford Mustang, according to early press releases, but there are no records or verification of any factory 427 Mustangs). In the spring of 1968, the 428 Cobra Jet officially replaced the 427; however, leftover 427s were installed until late June of that year, when stocks were depleted.
 1963–1964 Ford
 1963–1964 Mercury
 Low-riser intake, 2x4V
 1964 Ford Fairlane Thunderbolt, Mercury:
 High-riser intake, 2x4V
 1966–1967 Ford Fairlane 500 "R-Code", Mercury
 Mid-riser intake, 4V
 1965–1967 Ford
 1965–1967 Mercury
 Mid-riser intake, two 4-barrel Holley 780 CFM carburetor
 1965–1967 Ford
 1965–1967 Mercury
 1965–1967 Shelby Cobra 427.

428

With its  bore size, the 427 block was expensive to manufacture as the slightest shifting of the casting cores could make a block casting unusable. Therefore, Ford combined attributes that had worked well in previous incarnations of the FE – a  stroke and a  bore – to create an easier-to-make engine with nearly identical displacement. The  engine used a cast nodular iron crankshaft and external balancer.

428 FE engines were fitted to Galaxies
(badged simply as '7 Litre') and Thunderbirds in the 1966 and 1967 model years. It was also found in Mustangs, Mercury Cougars, some AC (Shelby) Cobras and various other Fords from 1968.  This engine was also available as standard equipment in 1966 and 1967 in the Mercury S-55.

428 engine configurations and applications
 4V, 10.5:1
 1966–1967 Ford
 1966–1967 Ford Thunderbird
 1966–1967 Mercury
 1966-1967 Ford 7-Litre
 1966-1967 Mercury S-55
 1966–1970 Ford Police Interceptor
 1966–1970 Mercury Police
 1969 Shelby GT500KR
Interceptor
 1968 Ford
 1968 Mercury
 1968 Shelby GT500
 1967 Shelby GT500

428 Cobra Jet

The 428 Cobra Jet was a performance version of the 428 FE. Launched in April 1968, it was built on a regular production line using a variety of cylinder heads combined with a 735 CFM Holley four-barrel carburetor. The Cobra Jet used heavier connecting rods with a 13/32 rod bolt and a nodular iron crankshaft casting #1UB. A Holman and Moody specially prepared "stripper", which carried no sound deadener, undercoating, or any optional factory equipment, was used as the introductory press car in 1968.

Historical road test data on actual production 428 CJ cars suggest peak output in the neighborhood of 275 SAE Net ("as installed") HP, using published trap speed and "as tested" weights, and Hale's trap speed formula. Period road tests revealed quarter mile performance in the low 14-second to very high 13-second range, with trap speeds around :

Despite urban legend suggesting that this engine produced 410 HP in production line stock form, meticulously prepared but primarily faithful to production line stock examples prove otherwise:

The 428 Cobra Jet engine (modified to the NHRA Stock and Super Stock technical specifications) made its drag racing debut at 1968 NHRA Winternationals, held from February 2–4, 1968, at the Auto Club Raceway at Los Angeles County Fairgrounds, in Pomona, California. Ford Motor Company sponsored five drivers (Gas Ronda, Jerry Harvey, Hubert Platt, "Dyno Don" Nicholson, Kenneth McLellan, and Al Joniec) to race six 428 CJ-equipped Mustangs. The engine lived up to expectations as four of the cars made it to their respective class finals. Al Joniec won both his class (defeating Hubert Platt in an all-CJ final) and the overall Super Stock Eliminator title (defeating Dave Wren who ‘red lighted’ in his faster 426 Race Hemi Plymouth).

428 Cobra-Jet engine configurations and applications
 1968 Ford Mustang
 1968 Mercury Cougar
 1968 Shelby GT500KR
 1968 Ford Fairlane
 1968 Ford Torino
 1968 Mercury Comet
 1968 Mercury Cyclone
 1969–1970 Ford Mustang
 1969–1970 Mercury Cougar
 1969 Ford Fairlane
 1969 Ford Torino
 1969 Ford Cobra
 1969 Mercury Montego, Cyclone and CJ

428 Super Cobra Jet

The 428 Super Cobra Jet  (also known as the 428SCJ) used the same top end, pistons, cylinder heads, camshaft, valve train, induction system, exhaust manifolds, and engine block as the 428 Cobra Jet.  However, the crankshaft and connecting rods were strengthened and associated balancing altered for drag racing. A nodular iron crankshaft casting #1UA was used as well as heavier 427 "Le Mans" connecting rods with capscrews instead of bolts for greater durability. The heavier connecting rods and the removal of the centre counterweight on the stock 428 Cobra Jet crankshaft (1UA), required an external weight on the snout of the crankshaft for balancing. A 428 Super Cobra Jet engine with oil cooler was standard equipment when the "Drag Pack" option (which came when selecting either a 3.91 or 4.30 rear end gear ratio) was ordered with cars manufactured from 13 November 1968.  In addition, while the CJ and SCJ engines used the same autothermic piston casting, the piston-to-bore clearance specification between the CJ and SCJ 428 engines is slightly different, with the SCJ engines gaining a slightly looser fit to permit higher operating temperature. Horsepower measurements at a street rpm level remained the same. The 428 Super Cobra Jet engine was never offered with factory air conditioning due to the location of its engine oil cooler.

428 Cobra-Jet and Super Cobra-Jet engine configurations and applications
 Cobra-Jet and Super Cobra-Jet — Bore  X Stroke ; Valvetrain: OHV 2 valves per cylinder, naturally aspirated 4-barrel Holley carburetor, compression ratio: 10.6:1 rated at  @ 5200 rpm and maximum torque of  @ 3400 rpm
 1969–1970 Mercury Cougar
 1969 Ford Cobra
 1969 Mercury Cyclone

Vehicles
Selection of vehicles in which the FE was installed as original equipment:

Replacement 

By the mid-1970s the FE had been widely used in Ford vehicles for nearly two decades. To replace it, Ford had developed the 335-series engines, commonly referred to as "Cleveland" engines, and the 385-series engines. The last FE was installed in a production vehicle in 1976, and in the late 1970s the Dearborn Engine Plant that produced the FE engines was completely retooled to produce the 1.6 L engine introduced in the Ford Escort in 1981.

References

Further reading

External links
 
 

FE
V8 engines
Gasoline engines by model